Benjamin Wheatley (born 7 May 1972) is an English filmmaker and screenwriter. Beginning his career in advertising, Wheatley first gained recognition and acclaim for his commercials and short films, before transitioning into feature films and television programmes. He is best known for his work in the thriller and horror genres, with his films frequently incorporating heavy elements of black comedy and satire. His best-known works include the psychological horror films Kill List and A Field in England, the J. G. Ballard adaptation High-Rise and the action comedy Free Fire. 

Wheatley has received numerous accolades for his work, including an Evening Standard British Film Award, five British Independent Film Award nominations, and numerous awards and honours from film festivals including South by Southwest, Karlovy Vary, Mar del Plata, Raindance, Toronto and Cannes.

Personal life

Wheatley was born in Billericay, Essex, England. He went to Haverstock School in North London and it was here during the sixth form that he met Amy Jump, who is now his wife and co-founder of the "Mr and Mrs Wheatley" blog. The couple have a son and live in Brighton.

Career
Initially a short film maker and animator, Wheatley moved his work to the internet, and was a regular contributor to the b3ta message board. His clip cunning stunt, which shows his friend Rob Hill jumping over a car, has had over ten million views. The hundred or so short animations and games found on the "Mr and Mrs Wheatley" site were noticed by large media companies, and Wheatley's work expanded into mainstream media.

In 2006, Wheatley won a "Lion" award at Cannes advertising festival for directing the AMBX viral, with The Viral Factory. In July 2006 he directed live-action sections of the TV series Modern Toss ("i live ere", "Alan", "Drive by abuser", "Customer services", "Accident and emergency", "Citizens advice", "Illegal alphabet"), which was aired on Channel 4. Wheatley has also written and created clips for BBC Two's Time Trumpet, and has appeared in and directed sketches for BBC Three's Comedy Shuffle. Between 2007 and 2009 Wheatley directed series two of Modern Toss and Ideal series five and six. In 2008, Wheatley co-created and directed the sketch series The Wrong Door for BBC Three.

In May 2009, he directed the feature film Down Terrace in eight days; it won the Next Wave prize at Fantastic Fest in Austin and Best UK Feature at Raindance in London. In 2010, Wheatley completed his second feature, Kill List for Warp X. The film received critical acclaim and won Michael Smiley a British Independent Film Award for Best Supporting Actor. The movie holds a 76% rating on Rotten Tomatoes with a critic consensus describing the film as "an expertly executed slow-burn crime thriller that thrives on tension before morphing into visceral horror."

Wheatley's third film was the black comedy Sightseers, released in the UK in November 2012. It was written by its stars, Alice Lowe and Steve Oram, with additional material by Amy Jump, and was chosen for the Directors' Fortnight section of the 2012 Cannes Film Festival. Wheatley's fourth film, A Field in England was financed through the Film4 talent and ideas hub, Film4.0. It was followed in 2015 by High Rise, an adaptation of the J. G. Ballard novel of the same name. He has also directed advertisements for Blink Productions and Moxie.

A sci-fi TV series, Silk Road, to be written and directed by Wheatley, has been announced. It is said to be "in the vein of the Patrick McGoohan TV series The Prisoner, and will be screened on HBO. In 2014, Wheatley directed the first two episodes of the eighth series of Doctor Who, a show he has been a fan of since childhood.

Wheatley wrote and directed Free Fire (2016), starring an ensemble cast including Cillian Murphy, Brie Larson, Armie Hammer and Sharlto Copley. His film Happy New Year, Colin Burstead was made for the BBC 2018 Christmas schedule, and remains available to watch on iPlayer.

In November 2018, Wheatley was hired to direct an adaptation of Daphne du Maurier's gothic romance novel Rebecca, a Working Title Films production. Released on Netflix in October 2020, the film stars Lily James, Armie Hammer, and Kristin Scott Thomas. It received mixed reviews, with a score of 46 on review aggregator site Metacritic.

In the fall of 2019, Wheatley was announced as the director of the sequel for Tomb Raider, based on the popular video-game franchise of the same name and starring Academy Award-winning actress Alicia Vikander as Lara Croft, with Amy Jump to pen the script. However, in October 2020, it was announced that the film's March 2021 release had been delayed indefinitely, amid a series of production issues related to the COVID-19 pandemic. In January 2021, Wheatley was replaced by Lovecraft Country creator Misha Green, and the script was rewritten. As of July 2022, the film is in production.

In November 2020, it was announced that Wheatley had wrapped production on In the Earth, a pandemic-set horror film starring Joel Fry, Ellora Torchia, Hayley Squires and Reece Shearsmith. Neon released the film in the U.S. in 2021.

In October 2020, it was announced that Wheatley would take over the sequel to the science-fiction horror film The Meg, starring Jason Statham and Li Bingbing, based on Steve Alten's eponymous series of novels. Alten confirmed the sequel film will be an adaptation of the second book of the series, The Trench.

Filmography

Film

Executive Producer only
 The Duke of Burgundy (2014)
 ABCs of Death 2 (2014)
 Aaaaaaaah! (2015)
 Tank 432 (2015)
 The Greasy Strangler (2016)
 The Ghoul (2016)
 In Fabric (2018)

Television

Music videos
 "Formaldehyde" by Editors (2013)
 "Mork n Mindy" by Sleaford Mods (2020)

Awards and nominations

References

External links

1972 births
Living people
People from Billericay
English animators
British animated film directors
English television directors
People from Brighton
English film editors
English film directors
English screenwriters
English male screenwriters
English music video directors
English-language film directors